The men's elimination race competition at the 2023 UEC European Track Championships was held on 8 February 2023.

Results

References

Men's elimination race
European Track Championships – Men's elimination race